Yehoshua Menachem Pollack (born 1948) is an Israeli politician and a former member of the Knesset for Agudat Yisrael.

Biography
A former deputy mayor of Jerusalem, Pollack was placed eighth on the United Torah Judaism list for the 2006 Knesset elections. Although he missed out on a seat when the party won only five mandates, he entered the Knesset on 26 January 2009 as a replacement for the deceased Avraham Ravitz. However, he lost his seat in the February 2009 elections.

References

External links

1948 births
Living people
Agudat Yisrael politicians
Deputy Mayors of Jerusalem
Members of the 17th Knesset (2006–2009)
United Torah Judaism politicians